Werewolfism may refer to:

Lycanthropy, the condition of being a werewolf
Clinical lycanthropy, a mental disorder in which the patient believes he or she is a werewolf
Werewolf syndrome, a medical condition characterized by excessive facial and bodily hair

See also
Werewolf (disambiguation)